Don Johnston (30 October 1929 – 22 December 2018) was a South African swimmer. He competed in two events at the 1948 Summer Olympics.

References

1929 births
2018 deaths
South African male swimmers
Olympic swimmers of South Africa
Swimmers at the 1948 Summer Olympics
Sportspeople from Cape Town